was built in the year 664, in the third year of the Emperor Tenji's reign It was built in the Dazai urban prefecture, presently situated in central Fukuoka, Japan. It is believed it was built to be the Japanese Yamato court. The main reason for construction was that there was a fear of an invasion from the continent, and it is thought that the castle was ordered to be constructed to protect Dazaifu. There are some remains of the castle left, including some low walls in the countryside. The castle is often associated with Ōno Castle (Chikuzen Province).

The name "Mizuki" means "water fortress". The castle itself was 1.2 kilometres long, 80 metres wide and 10 meters high. It had a very large moat protecting the Hazaka side of the castle.

Current day site

The present site has a motorway running through it. There is nothing left of the Daifaru regional headquarters, except for an empty field. On site is a small museum, with information in English and Japanese. There is a model of Mizuki Castle in the nearby Kyushu National Museum.

The Castle was listed as one of the Continued Top 100 Japanese Castles in 2017.

See also 
 Ōno Castle (Echizen Province)
 Ōno Castle (Chita District, Owari Province)
 List of foreign-style castles in Japan

Literature

References

External links 
 Japan Atlas
 Daizaifu, City of Ancient Culture See item 4

Special Historic Sites
Buildings and structures in Dazaifu, Fukuoka
Archaeological sites in Japan
Tourist attractions in Fukuoka Prefecture
Former populated places in Japan
History of Fukuoka Prefecture
Parks and gardens in Fukuoka Prefecture
Castles in Fukuoka Prefecture
Asuka period
7th century in Japan